Covert action may refer to:

 Covert operation, a military operation intended to conceal one's identity
 Covert action in clandestine HUMINT, a form of espionage/intelligence
 Covert Action (album), a 2003 album by U.S. Bombs
 Covert Action (film), a 1978 film directed by Romolo Guerrieri
 CovertAction Quarterly, an anti-CIA magazine
 Sid Meier's Covert Action, a 1990 action and strategy video game